Plumas County is a county in the Sierra Nevada of the U.S. state of California. As of the 2020 census, the population was 19,790. The county seat is Quincy, and the only incorporated city is Portola. The largest community in the county is East Quincy. The county was named for the Spanish Río de las Plumas (the Feather River), which flows through it. The county itself is also the namesake of a native moth species, Hadena plumasata.

History
Prehistorically, the indigenous Mountain Maidu were the primary inhabitants of the area now known as Plumas County. The Maidu lived in small settlements along the edges of valleys, subsisting on roots, acorns, grasses, seeds, and occasionally fish and big game. They were decentralized and had no tribal leadership; most bands lived along waterways in and around their own valleys. Areas with high snowfall, including the Mohawk and Sierra valleys, were hunting grounds for game in the warmer months.

In 1848, European Americans discovered gold in the Sierra foothills. Miners were attracted to Plumas County in particular, largely due to the tales of Thomas Stoddard, who claimed to have discovered a lake lined with gold nuggets while lost in the wilderness. Gold-hungry prospectors flooded the area. Though hopeful miners scoured the glacial lakes for months, they did not find the purported lake of gold. But some had success panning for gold in the rivers and creeks in the area, and created squatters' villages, the first non-Native American settlements.

Rough shanty towns quickly sprang up around successful mining areas, including Rich Bar, Indian Bar, and Rabbit Creek (now La Porte). Many were developed adjacent to the Feather River, named Río de las Plumas by Spanish explorer Captain Luis Arguello in 1820.

In 1850, African-American frontiersman James Beckwourth discovered the lowest pass through the Sierras, which became known as Beckwourth Pass. Using the pass, he blazed a trail from Western Nevada through much of Plumas County, eventually terminating in the Sacramento Valley. Many erstwhile miners followed this trail into Plumas County. Beckwourth also set up a trading post in the western Sierra Valley that still stands today. Though the Beckwourth Trail was longer than the original emigrant trail that ran south of Plumas County, its lower elevations extended its seasonal use when the higher trail was snowbound and impassable. Between 1851 and 1854, the Beckwourth Trail was frequently traveled, but in 1854, use dropped sharply when it became a toll road. The toll to move a ton of freight from Bidwell Bar to Quincy was about $18. This made using the Beckwourth Road an expensive enterprise and use of the Beckwourth Trail declined.

Plumas County was formed in 1854 during a meeting of three commissioners at the American Ranch in Quincy. It was carved from the eastern portion of Butte County. Quincy, originally a mining town, was chosen as the county seat after an early settler donated a plot of land there to establish the seat. Once it became the seat, nearby Elizabethtown faded and ultimately became defunct. In 1864, the state legislature took a large portion of Plumas County to organize Lassen County. Shortly afterward, Plumas County annexed part of Sierra County, including the prosperous mining town of La Porte.

Over the next decades, different industries drove the growth of the various settlements that sprung up around the county. Greenville began as a mining and farming community in Indian Valley in the late 1850s. Chester was formed near the area that is now Lake Almanor, as a result of cattle ranching and the timber industry.

When the Western Pacific Railroad was constructed in 1910, Portola developed as an important railroad stop. Thanks to the railroad, Plumas County could export its lumber beyond the local area, and the timber industry became dominant in the county's economy for decades. As the railroad route extended up the Feather River Canyon, it was also used by the area's first tourists and sightseers. When the Feather River Highway was completed in 1937 with federal investment in infrastructure by President Franklin D. Roosevelt during the Great Depression, Plumas County became linked to the Sacramento Valley year-round thanks to the route's low elevation.

Geography

Plumas County is in the far northern end of the Sierra Nevada range. The area's rugged terrain marks the transition point between the northern Sierra Nevada and the southern end of the Cascade Range. Lassen Peak, the southernmost volcanic peak in the Cascade Range, is just north of Plumas County's border, and part of Lassen Volcanic National Park extends into the county's northwest corner.

Plumas National Forest's  offer a wide variety of outdoor recreation opportunities, including hiking, camping, kayaking, swimming, mountain biking, hunting and fishing. The area has more than 100 natural and artificial lakes. Many of the natural lakes are glacial in origin and can be found in and around Lakes Basin Recreation Area. The artificial lakes include Lake Almanor, Lake Davis, Frenchman Lake, Little Grass Valley Reservoir, Antelope Lake, and Bucks Lake. All three forks of the Feather River run through the area.

Designated Natural Areas
Butterfly Valley Botanical Area
Elephants Playground
Happy Valley
Little Last Chance Canyon Special Interest Area
North Valley
Valley Creek Special Interest Area

Water areas

Antelope Lake
Belden Forebay
Bucks Lake
Butt Valley Reservoir
Doyle Reservoir
Eureka Lake
Faggs Debris Dam
Faggs Reservoir
Fowler Lake

Frenchman Lake
Grizzly Forebay
Grizzly Ice Pond
Juniper Lake
Lake Almanor
Lake Davis
Little Grass Valley Reservoir
Lower Bucks Lake
Murphy Lake

Onion Valley Reservoir
Rock Creek Reservoir
Round Valley Reservoir
Silver Lake
Slate Creek Reservoir
Smith Lake
Three Lakes
Walker Mine Tailings Reservoir

Adjacent counties
 Sierra County - south
 Yuba County - southwest
 Butte County - west
 Tehama County - northwest
 Shasta County - northwest
 Lassen County - northeast

National protected areas
 Lassen National Forest (part)
 Lassen Volcanic National Park (part)
 Plumas National Forest (part)
 Tahoe National Forest (part)

Demographics

2011

Places by population, race, and income

2010

The 2010 United States Census reported that Plumas County had a population of 20,007. The racial makeup of Plumas County was 17,797 (89.0%) White, 192 (1.0%) African American, 539 (2.7%) Native American, 134 (0.7%) Asian, 18 (0.1%) Pacific Islander, 603 (3.0%) from other races, and 724 (3.6%) from two or more races.  Hispanic or Latino of any race were 1,605 persons (8.0%).

2000

As of the census of 2000, there were 20,824 people, 9,000 households, and 6,047 families residing in the county. The population density was 8 people per square mile (3/km2). There were 13,386 housing units at an average density of 5 per square mile (2/km2). The racial makeup of the county was 91.8% White, 0.6% Black or African American, 2.6% Native American, 0.5% Asian, 0.1% Pacific Islander, 1.8% from other races, and 2.6% from two or more races. 5.7% of the population were Hispanic or Latino of any race. 16.1% were of German, 15.0% English, 10.1% Irish and 8.0% American ancestry according to Census 2000. 95.4% spoke English and 3.6% Spanish as their first language.

There were 9,000 households, out of which 26.4% had children under the age of 18 living with them, 55.4% were married couples living together, 8.0% had a female householder with no husband present, and 32.8% were non-families. 27.5% of all households were made up of individuals, and 10.1% had someone living alone who was 65 years of age or older. The average household size was 2.29 and the average family size was 2.77.

In the county, the population was spread out, with 22.7% under the age of 18, 6.0% from 18 to 24, 22.6% from 25 to 44, 30.8% from 45 to 64, and 17.9% who were 65 years of age or older. The median age was 44 years. For every 100 females there were 99.8 males. For every 100 females age 18 and over, there were 97.9 males.

The median income for a household in the county was $36,351, and the median income for a family was $46,119. Males had a median income of $38,742 versus $25,734 for females. The per capita income for the county was $19,391. About 9.0% of families and 13.1% of the population were below the poverty line, including 16.7% of those under age 18 and 6.4% of those age 65 or over.

Law and government
Plumas County has five elected Supervisors, each elected within their own district. The Board of Supervisors oversees the management of county government and members serve four-year terms. The Clerk of the Board of Supervisors provides support to the Board of Supervisors and information to the public.

The County Administrative Office's purpose is to facilitate the delivery of cost-effective county services in accordance with the vision and policies outlined by the Board of Supervisors. Its responsibilities include monitoring legislative affairs, preparing the county's annual budget, and undertaking studies and investigations for the Board of Supervisors.

The sheriff is the chief law enforcement officer of the county. The sheriff's jurisdiction extends throughout the county, including federal and state lands. The county sheriff is elected to the nonpartisan office for a four-year term and is charged with preserving the peace, enforcing criminal statutes, and investigating known or suspected criminal activity.

More than three-quarters of Plumas County's  is National Forest Service land. The management of Plumas National Forest is overseen by three districts: Beckwourth Ranger District, Mt. Hough Ranger District, and Feather River Ranger District.

Politics

Voter registration

Cities by population and voter registration

Overview 
In its early history, Plumas was a reliable Republican county, voting for that party in every election from 1864 to 1908. It then became one of the most reliably Democratic counties in California, voting for the Democratic nominee for president in 13 straight elections from 1928 to 1976. The county has voted Republican in every presidential election since 1980, except for 1992, when Bill Clinton won a small plurality.

  
  
  
  
  
  
  
  
  
  
  
  
  
  
  
  
  
  
  
  
  
  
  
  
  
  
  
  
  
  
  

Crime 
The following table includes the number of incidents reported and the rate per 1,000 persons for each type of offense.

Culture
 The town of Portola is home to the Western Pacific Railroad Museum, one of the largest railroad museums in North America. It is one of the county's major tourist attractions.
 The town of Chester is home to the Collins Pine Museum, completed in 2007 and dedicated to educating the public about the history of the Collins Pine Company's (a division of The Collins Companies) logging operations in the Chester region.
 The Plumas County Museum in Quincy is notable for exhibits on the Maidu people, the California Gold Rush, logging, and the Variel House. It also hosts contemporary art exhibits.

Media
The primary local news source since 1866 is Feather Publishing Co., Inc. Until 2020, four Plumas County newspapers were published every Wednesday, except for certain holidays; all content is now available online instead at plumasnews.com.

Plumas County is in the Sacramento television market, and thus receives Sacramento media. Sacramento stations KXTV and KCRA regularly cover major news events in Plumas County.

Education
Feather River College

Transportation

Major highways
 State Route 36
 State Route 49
 State Route 70
 State Route 89
 State Route 284

Scenic byways
The Feather River National Scenic Byway follows the Middle and North Forks of the Feather River, traversing steep canyon walls and high mountain valleys. The route features grasslands, oak woodlands, mixed conifer, and high desert chaparral. It begins in the Sacramento Valley, following the Feather River Canyon and entering Plumas County just west of Storrie. As it gains elevation, it climbs over the crest of the Sierra and passes through Quincy and Portola, eventually reaching the Middle Fork of the Feather River and following it to its headwaters in Sierra Valley. After going through Beckwourth Pass, the route terminates at Hallelujah Junction on Highway 395.

The southernmost point of the Volcanic Legacy Scenic Byway, Lake Almanor, is in Plumas County. The route spans 500 miles between California and Oregon and has views of dramatic volcanic landscapes, including nearby Lassen Peak.

The Scenic Byway Link is the section of Highway 89 that connects the Volcanic Legacy and Feather River Scenic Byways. Featuring the alpine meadows of Indian Valley, the rushing waters of Indian Creek, and views of Mt. Hough and the surrounding mountains, the route is about 18 miles long.

Public transit
Plumas Transit Systems, operated by the county, provides local service in Quincy and routes to Chester and Portola.

Airports
Gansner Field is a general aviation airport near Quincy. Rogers Field is near Chester; in addition to its civil-aviation role it also serves as the Chester Air Attack Base, a logistical and coordination facility for the California Department of Forestry's aerial firefighting (both fixed-wing and helicopter). Resources include fueling, retardant loading, communications, and some quartering for aircrew and ground firefighting teams. Nervino Airport is in Beckwourth, east of Portola.

Communities

City
Portola

Census-designated places

Beckwourth
Belden
Blairsden
Bucks Lake
Canyondam
Caribou
Chester
Chilcoot-Vinton
Clio
Crescent Mills
C-Road
Cromberg
Delleker
East Quincy
East Shore
Gold Mountain
Graeagle
Greenhorn
Greenville
Hamilton Branch
Indian Falls
Iron Horse
Johnsville
Keddie
La Porte
Lake Almanor Country Club
Lake Almanor Peninsula
Lake Almanor West
Lake Davis
Little Grass Valley
Mabie
Meadow Valley
Mohawk Vista
Paxton
Plumas Eureka
Prattville
Quincy (county seat)
Spring Garden
Storrie
Taylorsville
Tobin
Twain
Valley Ranch
Warner Valley
Whitehawk

Unincorporated communities

American House
Buckeye
Cascade
Drakesbad
Feather River Park
Gate Place
Genesee
Longville
Massack
Palmetto
Prospect
Rock Creek
Seneca
Sloat
Spanish Ranch

Ghost towns 
Almanor

Population ranking
The population ranking of the following table is based on the 2010 census of Plumas County.

† county seat

See also
List of school districts in Plumas County, California
National Register of Historic Places listings in Plumas County, California
Western Pacific Railroad Museum

Notes

References

External links

Plumas County News
Discover Plumas County
Plumas political entities
Plumas County, California
 Fariss and Smith's History of Plumas, Lassen & Sierra Counties California, 1882

 

 
California counties
Shasta Cascade
Populated places established in 1854
1854 establishments in California